The acronym CSW may refer to:

Organisations
 Central and South West Corporation, a former electricity provider acquired by American Electric Power
 Christian Solidarity Worldwide, a United Kingdom-based human rights organisation, specialising in religious freedom
 Combinatie Sportclub Wilnis, a Dutch football club
 United Nations Commission on the Status of Women, a functional commission of the UN Economic and Social Council

Educational institutions
 The Cambridge School of Weston
 Charter School of Wilmington, a Charter School in Delaware
 College of the Southwest, a private four-year college (now university) in Hobbs, New Mexico

Occupations
 Clinical social worker, a credential in the field of social work
 Commercial sex worker
 Communication Support Worker, in the UK, one who supports the communication of deaf students using British Sign Language

Transport
 Cashew MRT station, Singapore; MRT station abbreviation
 Cheung Sha Wan station, Hong Kong; MTR station code

Other uses
 Catalog Service for the Web, standard from the Open Geospatial Consortium
 Central States Wrestling, the commonly used name for Heart of America Sports Attractions a wrestling promotion based in Kansas City that closed down in 1988
 Cerebral salt-wasting syndrome, a rare endocrine disorder, characterised by hyponatremia and dehydration
 Cheung Sha Wan, an area of New Kowloon, Hong Kong
 Collins Scrabble Words, an official word list for English Scrabble outside North America
 Craig Steven Wright, Australian computer scientist associated with bitcoin
 Credit spread widening, in finance, a deterioration in credit quality
 Crew-served weapon, a type of military weapon system.